"The Ebony Falcon" is the fourteenth episode of the first season of the American television police sitcom series Brooklyn Nine-Nine. It was written by Prentice Penny and directed by Michael Blieden, airing on Fox in the United States on January 21, 2014.

In the episode, Peralta and Charles Boyle (Joe Lo Truglio) are investigating a drug trafficking operation and seek Terry Jeffords's (Terry Crews) help in the case. The episode was seen by an estimated 4.55 million household viewers and gained a 1.9/5 ratings share among adults aged 18–49, according to Nielsen Media Research. The episode received mostly positive reviews from critics, who praised Terry Crews' performance in the episode.

Plot
While investigating a steroid trafficking operation in a gym, Jake Peralta (Andy Samberg) and Charles Boyle (Joe Lo Truglio) recruit Terry Jeffords (Terry Crews) to join them. Jeffords was formerly nicknamed "The Ebony Falcon" when he did fieldwork for the precinct. The detectives aim to infiltrate the steroid trafficking organization and detain those responsible. Meanwhile, Raymond Holt (Andre Braugher) orders Amy Santiago (Melissa Fumero) and Rosa Diaz (Stephanie Beatriz) to research a theft Gina Linetti (Chelsea Peretti) suffered at her apartment.

Reception

Viewers
In its original American broadcast, "The Ebony Falcon" was seen by an estimated 4.55 million household viewers and gained a 1.9/5 ratings share among adults aged 18–49, according to Nielsen Media Research. This was a 28% increase in viewership from the previous episode, which was watched by 3.53 million viewers with a 1.4/4 in the 18-49 demographics. This means that 1.9 percent of all households with televisions watched the episode, while 5 percent of all households watching television at that time watched it. With these ratings, Brooklyn Nine-Nine was the most watched show on FOX for the night, beating New Girl, Dads and The Mindy Project, third on its timeslot and third for the night in the 18-49 demographics, behind a rerun NCIS, and The Biggest Loser.

Critical reviews
"The Ebony Falcon" received positive reviews from critics. Roth Cornet of IGN gave the episode a "great" 8.5 out of 10 and wrote, "Brooklyn Nine-Nines 'Ebony Falcon' brought two often underutilized members of the ensemble into focus. The fear-based A and B storylines paralleled one another nicely, and it was good to see more from both Jeffords and Gina than we ordinarily do. One hopes that the series will continue to flesh out the support characters as it goes along. Though it might be nice to return to the essential Holt-Peralta dynamic in a fresh, new way in the weeks to come."

Alasdair Wilkins of The A.V. Club gave the episode a "B" grade and wrote, "Indeed, 'The Ebony Falcon' tries to dig deeper into Peralta's abandonment issues, with at best moderate success. Brooklyn Nine-Nine is playing the long game with this particular bit of backstory, so it's not surprising that the story only vaguely touches on the underlying reasons for Jake’s sudden protectiveness. It's just that the connection between Jake's sudden concern for Cagney and Lacey’s father and his own personal trauma is something that we are told about without ever quite being shown. I'm generally a fan of Andy Samberg's performance, particularly how he infuses Jake with his specific brand of off-kilter goofiness, but he's not quite at the point where he can sell such a big emotional revelation in just a handful of lines. That’s the kind of problem that should be solved simply with more time in the role, so when Brooklyn Nine-Nine really digs into this story sometime later — perhaps in its now all but assured second season—I suspect Samberg will be up to the task."

Alan Sepinwall of HitFix wrote, "The previous episodes had done a good job of pairing Peralta with a lot of different characters: most often Santiago or Boyle, but Diaz or Holt enough to make an impression. The one cop he hadn’t been teamed with yet was Terry, in part because Terry began the series on the sidelines, dealing with his fear issues. That’s a funny idea for a big, imposing guy like Terry Crews to play, but it also kept one of the show’s funniest performers out of the orbit of its central character."

References

External links

2014 American television episodes
Brooklyn Nine-Nine (season 1) episodes